China Railway Beijing Group, officially abbreviated as CR Beijing or CR-Beijing, formerly, Beijing Railway Administration is a subsidiaries company under the jurisdiction of the China Railway (formerly the Ministry of Railway). It supervises the railway network within Beijing, Tianjin, and Hebei Province. CR Beijing also operates and supervises the expansion of the Beijing Suburban Railway, the commuter rail service linking urban Beijing and surrounding suburbs. The railway administration was reorganized as a company in November 2017.

High speed services on the Beijing-Tianjin intercity railway are also managed by CR Beijing.

Hub stations
 Beijing
 Tianjin
 Shijiazhuang
 , 
 Tangshan
 ,

Regional services

S-train services
  Beijing Suburban Railway
 Tianjin
  (S9)
 Yangquan

C-train services

References

External links
Official website (Chinese)

Ministry of Railways of China
Rail transport in Beijing
China Railway Corporation